The Local Sheet in astronomy is a nearby extragalactic region of space where the Milky Way, the members of the Local Group and other galaxies share a similar peculiar velocity. Typical velocity dispersion of galaxies is only  in the radial direction. Nearly all nearby bright galaxies belong to the Local Sheet. The Local Sheet is part of the Local Volume and is in the Virgo Supercluster (Local Supercluster). The Local Sheet forms a wall of galaxies delineating one boundary of the Local Void.

A significant component of the mean velocity of the galaxies in the Local Sheet appears as the result of the gravitational attraction of the Virgo Cluster of galaxies, resulting in a peculiar motion ~ toward the cluster. A second component is directed away from the center of the Local Void; an expanding region of space spanning an estimated  that is only sparsely populated with galaxies. The Local Sheet is inclined 8° from the Local Supercluster (Virgo Supercluster).

Ten of these are spirals, while the remaining two are ellipticals. The two ellipticals (Maffei 1 and Centaurus A) lie on opposite sides of the Local Group.

* The mass is given as the logarithm (base unspecified) of the mass in solar masses.

See also
 Local Void, the Local Sheet defining the wall of galaxies at one end of the void
 Supergalactic coordinate system, the coordinate system taking the Local Sheet, the Supergalactic Plane, as its X–Y bases

References

 
Galaxy superclusters 
Large-scale structure of the cosmos